The Ineos Grenadier is an off-road utility vehicle designed and produced by Ineos Automotive Ltd. It went into production in July 2022.  The Grenadier was designed to be a modern replacement of the original Land Rover Defender, with boxy bodywork, a steel ladder chassis, beam axles with long-travel progressive-rate coil spring suspension (front and rear), and powered by BMW six-cylinder internal combustion engines.

History

Ineos Automotive Ltd. was founded by Sir Jim Ratcliffe, billionaire and chairman of the multinational chemicals company Ineos. Ratcliffe came up with the idea of building a replacement for his Land Rover Defender and approached Jaguar Land Rover to buy the tooling to continue production after the original model ceased at Solihull after 67 years in January 2016. Ratcliffe later decided to initiate a project to design and build a similar vehicle under the codename Projekt Grenadier.

The vehicle is named after Ratcliffe's favourite pub, The Grenadier, in Belgravia, London, where the initial idea was considered, and where a promotional presentation was shown. Comparing this project to James Dyson's plan to build an electric car in Singapore, which was cancelled in October 2019, writing off £500 million of his own money, an industry insider commented "If JLR, which made the Defender for 70 years, is struggling, then that's an indicator of how tough it's going to be for a newcomer".

The vehicle was proposed to be manufactured in Wales, but later confirmed to be made in France. Production started in July 2022 at Ineos Automotive plant in Hambach, France.

In October 2022, the Ineos Grenadier goes into production, with the first deliveries set for December.

Development

In March 2019, Ineos Automotive announced that it had entered into a powertrain technology partnership with BMW. It was announced in September 2019 that the Grenadier would be manufactured at a bespoke new manufacturing facility on a greenfield site in Bridgend, Wales. Ineos Automotive also confirmed that it would be investing in a sub-assembly plant in Estarreja, Portugal, for the Grenadier's body and chassis. In December 2019, Ineos Automotive announced the Austrian-based Magna Steyr as their engineering partner for the development of the Grenadier. This partnership would oversee turning the development project concept into a mass-produced machine. Development of the off-roader will see it undergo 1.1 million miles (1.8 million km) as part of a grueling testing regime. Mark Tennant, the commercial director of Ineos Automotive, told the Financial Times there had been 50,000 expressions of interest before the designs of the vehicle had been made public. The brand expects to build 25,000 Grenadier models a year at full capacity. In June 2020, Ineos Automotive unveiled a first look at the exterior design of the Grenadier, as well as some technical information relating to the vehicle's chassis, towing capabilities and suspension.

On 7 July 2020, it was reported that Ineos Automotive was in talks with Daimler AG, the owners of Mercedes-Benz, to buy the Smart factory in Hambach, France, and build the Grenadier there instead of Wales and Portugal. "It's a serious business consideration," Tennant said. Ken Skates, Welsh Government Minister for Economy, Transport and North Wales said it would be "a real blow if Ineos reneged on its very public commitment". The government of Wales was reported in July 2020 to have spent £5 million on supporting the Ineos factory development at Bridgend with enabling work and road infrastructure, and said at that time that it would "look to recoup appropriate costs from the company" if the Bridgend factory was cancelled.

In November 2020, it was announced that Ineos would work with Korean carmaker Hyundai on a longer-term plan to develop a reliable source of hydrogen in Europe to use Hyundai fuel cell technology, with no carbon dioxide emissions, on later Grenadier production.

On 8 December 2020 Ineos announced it had purchased the Smartville factory at Hambach, France, to build the Grenadier, stating that the site's location "gives excellent access to supply chains, automotive talent and target markets". Ineos denied on Twitter having received "grants or other direct financial support" from either the Welsh or Portuguese governments.

On 29 September 2021, Ineos announced it would locate its North American headquarters in Raleigh, North Carolina. In November 2021, Ineos Automotive revealed that it had made losses exceeding £250 million over three years on the project. Other companies owned by Ratcliffe made loans to the automotive subsidiary, so that his total commitment at the time could be over £650m.

In January 2022, Ineos' engineering team was caught in a ‘one-in-a-hundred year (flood) event’ during hot weather testing in outback South Australia. Ineos plans on returning to Australia to complete this testing, along with undertaking an expedition of the Canning Stock Route.

Design

While the Grenadier is not a direct replica of a Land Rover Defender (it uses none of the original tooling or componentry), Toby Ecuyer made it very clear that their mission was specifically to build a modern Defender, citing the 'massive shame' it was that the outgoing Defender was ceasing production. In an interview with Autocar UK, he explained that their mission initially began with trying to do just that. "We thought, well, we’ll replace it. Then we thought, let’s build a better one, something that doesn’t leak and is comfortable. After all, this isn’t 1948. We can move on." Speaking on how they would modernise the Defender's design he stated "That was when we started collecting similar vehicles – Bronco, Pajero, G-Wagen, various Jeeps – to see how other manufacturers had done it".

At the online launch, Toby Ecuyer, Head of Design at Ineos Automotive, said: "We had Jeeps, Land Rovers, Toyota Hiluxes, a Toyota Land Cruiser, Nissan Patrols, Ford Broncos. And we looked at vans, lorries, Unimogs, military vehicles, tractors. African-spec vehicles were particularly interesting. They all shaped our plan for a vehicle that would be extremely capable but also very honest and uncomplicated"" The exterior design of the Grenadier was shown to the public for the first time in an online launch on 1 July 2020. At the launch Ratcliffe said "The Grenadier project started by identifying a gap in the market, abandoned by a number of manufacturers, for a utilitarian off-road vehicle. This gave us our engineering blueprint for a capable, durable and reliable 4x4 built to handle the world’s harshest environments".

Steve Cropley, Editor in Chief at Autocar said "The result is a simple, well-proportioned and familiar-looking off-roader."

Ecuyer is hoping that none of the inevitable discussion of the homage to the Defender's design obscures the unique and utilitarian design behind the Grenadier: the roof that doubles as a load rack, the roof tie bars (that go roughly where the Defender 110 has roof lights), the two-piece rear door, the exposed door hinges and the multi-purpose ‘utility rails’ that run along the exterior of the door panels where scuff bars would usually be placed.

Specification
The Grenadier is powered by a choice of BMW six-cylinder engines; the 3.0L B58 inline 6 petrol engine and the 3.0L B57 inline 6 diesel engine. In the Grenadier, B57 diesel engine makes 183 kW of power (3250-4200rpm) and 550Nm of torque (1250-3000rpm). The B58 petrol engine makes 210 kW of power (4750rpm) and 450Nm of torque (1750-4000rpm).

Both engines come mated to a ZF eight-speed automatic transmission (codenamed 8HP51 for the petrol, 8HP76 for the diesel), with what Ineos calls a new “heavy duty” torque converter.

All Grenadiers come standard with permanent four-wheel drive (4WD), with low-range accessed through a 2.5:1 Tremec two-speed transfer case.

The Grenadier is built on a box-section ladder frame chassis. There are heavy duty Carraro beam axles at each end, paired to five-link coil suspension supplied by Eibach offering nine degrees of front axle articulation and 12 degrees at the rear, and anti-roll bars for road handling.

Fuel cell version
Tennant said that internal combustion engines were best for "rough, tough jobs", and pointed out the need for good range and autonomy in remoter parts of the world, with hydrogen fuel cells part of the longer-term plan.

Deploying a hydrogen supply chain could in itself benefit Ineos, which produces 300,000 - 400,000 tonnes of hydrogen a year.

Gallery

References

External links

 

Cars introduced in 2020
Off-road vehicles
All-wheel-drive vehicles
Mid-size sport utility vehicles